Kung-Fu Chess is a chess variant that removes the concept of turns and allows multiple pieces to move simultaneously. It was created by Shizmoo Games as a "real-time" in the early 2000s and remained on the company's website until the website shut down in 2008. Other online servers have since appeared.

Background
The game was conceptualized in the early 2000s by Dan Goldstein as a "real-time" version of chess; it was later developed by him and his brother Joshua Goldstein under the name "Ultra Speed Chess". The name was later changed to "Kung-Fu Chess" to reflect the martial-arts themed sound effects that would play during the players' moves. The game was published by Shizmoo Games on the company's website and it  won the Audience Choice award in the 2002 Independent Games Festival. Following with the martial arts theme, the game also featured a rating system categorized by belt colors. It was later supplemented with additional variants (such as Four-player chess, Crazyhouse, and Bughouse chess) before the website shut down in 2008.

The original version was added to the ICQ instant messaging program in 2005.

The app Chezz is based on Kung-Fu Chess, adding concepts such as an adventure mode that allows for upgrading pieces to allow them to move more often.

Rules

In Kung-Fu Chess, either player can move any available piece at any given moment, though only one piece can be moved at a time. After a piece is moved, a predefined delay prevents it from moving again for a short period of time. This, plus piece movements not being instantaneous, means that speed and timing are crucial aspects of the game, as any delay could determine whether a piece is captured or not.

In addition to this, the game's "real-time" aspect leads to essential differences between Kung-Fu Chess and standard chess. For instance, checks and pins do not exist in the game, since players are not bound to one move at a time and thus could respond to threats with multiple piece movements. Checkmate and stalemate were similarly both impossible to achieve; as such, the game only ended when one's king was physically captured or if one's opponent resigned.

References

External links
GameSpy article
GameDev.net article

Chess variants